The 1983 PBA Reinforced Filipino Conference Finals was the best-of-5 basketball championship series of the 1983 PBA Reinforced Filipino Conference, and the conclusion of the conference playoffs.

The Crispa Redmanizers won their second championship of the season and 11th league title, winning over first-time finalist Great Taste Coffee Makers, three games to two, in their best-of-five championship series.

Qualification

Games summary

Game 1

Game 2

Game 3

In a closely fought contest, Crispa import Billy Ray Bates got his fifth foul with 4:08 left in the game, the Redmanizers levelled the count for the last time at 115-all with 3:27 remaining, Bogs Adornado and Ricardo Brown unloaded a 6–0 bomb to put Great Taste ahead for good, 121–115 with two minutes left.

Game 4

From a 31–26 advantage for Crispa after the first period, Billy Ray Bates suddenly catch fire in the second quarter, back-to-back three-pointers and a fastbreak lay-up by Bates gave the Redmanizers a 50–32 lead. The Coffee Makers came within eight points, 76–84 in the third quarter, but Bates spearhead a 14–4 Crispa run that sent Great Taste reeling from the onslaught at the end of the crucial third period. Crispa blew the game wide open in the fourth quarter, leading by as many as 26 points, 125–99 with 3:14 left in the game.

Game 5

Crispa led 63–49 at halftime of the deciding fifth game, the Redmanizers padded their lead to 17 points, 76–59 in the third quarter, but the Coffee Makers countered with a 12–2 run to trimmed the deficit at 71–78 with 5:52 remaining, Atoy Co's turnaround jumper just before the buzzer sounded ending the third period put Crispa up front, 97–85. Great Taste were down by eight, 94–102, when Bernie Fabiosa got an easy inside basket and Bates hitting one from the left and Yoyoy Villamin making a follow-up shot as Crispa's lead were back to 14 points, 108–94, Billy Ray Bates was unstoppable as the Redmanizers answered every baskets the Coffee Makers made, Abet Guidaben finalized the count with an open lay-up for a 139–120 tally.

Rosters

Broadcast notes

References

Crispa Redmanizers games
Great Taste Coffee Makers games
1983
1983 PBA season
PBA Reinforced Filipino Conference Finals